Colegio Maestro Ávila is a Catholic primary and secondary school located in Salamanca, Spain. It was funded by the priests of the Diocesan Labour Priests Brotherhood in honour of Emmanuel Domingo y Sol

External links

Buildings and structures in Salamanca